Sir John Williams, 1st Baronet, may refer to:

Sir John Williams, 1st Baronet, of Minster (c. 1609 – 1669)
Sir John Williams, 1st Baronet, of Bodelwyddan (1761–1830)
Sir John Williams, 1st Baronet, of the City of London (1840–1926)